Ballymun is an outer suburb of Dublin, Ireland, at the northern edge of the Northside, the green-field development of which began in the 1960s to accommodate a housing crisis in inner city areas of Dublin. While the newly built housing was state-of-the-art at the time, comprising high-rise tower blocks and flat complexes, residents were moved in years before shops, schools and other infrastructure were fully ready, and the area became well known for both a strong community spirit and considerable social challenges. Ballymun has several sub-districts such as Sillogue, Coultry, Shangan and Poppintree, and is close to both the Republic of Ireland's only IKEA store and to Dublin Airport.  The area is the source of one Dublin river, and parts lie in the floodplain of another, and there are a number of parks.

In 1997, a regeneration plan was announced, which led to demolition of the flats over time and their replacement by new low-rise housing, along with some civic amenities, a number of arts projects, including the participative tree-planting project amaptocare, and an unfinished civic plaza, but also saw the loss of many of the area's shops, including the demolition of the only shopping centre.  The regeneration, originally budgeted at €442 million, had cost at least €1 billion as of 2016, for the public elements. A metro stop on a city-to-airport line was planned but the plans were later shelved.

Geography
Ballymun lies on the plains of southern Fingal (the historic area, rather than the modern county), sloping from northwest to southeast, from the catchment of the Santry River through that of the Wad River. The Santry rises in Harristown and Dubber, northwest of Ballymun, and crosses and drains the northern parts of the district. The Wad is the area's main watershed, with branches most notably around Poppintree; it flows southeast, eventually reaching the estuary of the River Tolka at Clontarf

Ballymun neighbours Finglas, Glasnevin and Santry.

History
In the 1300s the land was controlled by the Baron Skryne, County Meath. Richard Stanyhurst was granted 180 acres at Ballymun in 1473 upon his marriage to Agneta of the Barons of Scyrne family. The Burnell family held the lands of Ballymun and Balgriffin until 1534, when John Burnell was executed for supporting the rebellion of Silken Thomas. The lands then passed to the Bathe family of Drumcondra. By 1615, Robert Barnwell of Dunbro held the lands of Ballymun, and by 1641 there were just 2 or 3 cottages and a single thatched house in the area. The population in 1659 was 10 people, 4 born in England, and 6 Irish. In 1662, just 3 residents paid a hearth tax in the area.

In the early 1700s, the tower house at Ballymun was constructed as a mill, which was subsequently taken over by an English educational society in 1744 to found a girls Charter School. It was later converted to a boys school, before closing in 1825. The building still stands and is today called Santry Lodge. Due to the dense woodland and sparse population, the area was generally regarded as dangerous in the early 1700s, with numerous highwaymen operating on the Drogheda Road. In 1829, the Freeman's Journal noted that Ballymun was a popular place for duels. The area known as Stormanstown is named after Lord Stormingston who was granted land in Ballymun by Henry VIII, with the original Stormanstown House which was built in the early 18th century. This tiled mansion was demolished in 1823, and another house of the same name replaced it. This house was used by the Albert Agricultural College as offices in the 20th century until it was demolished in 1970. Another house called Stormanstown on the corner of Glasnevin Avenue and Ballymun Road was the former residence of Brian O'Higgins. It too was demolished in the 1970s.

Public housing for Dublin
By the 1960s, Dublin's housing stock was not only under pressure from a rising population but was also poorly maintained. House collapses in Bolton Street and Fenian Street in 1963 led to the death of four people, forcing Dublin Corporation to adopt 'emergency measures' to deal with the crisis. In 1964, in a response to this housing crisis in inner city areas of the capital, plans were made to build high-rise flat complexes; construction started in 1966 and were completed by the following year. The seven 15-storey towers were named after Irish Republican revolutionaries, to commemorate the 50th anniversary of the 1916 Easter Rising. The flat complexes consisted of five 8-storey "districts" (Balbutcher, Balcurris, Coultry, Shangan and Sillogue) and three 4-storey "districts," two of which were part of Shangan and Sillogue, the third being located in Sandyhill. The Poppintree area of Ballymun was constructed in the late 1970s.

Original development 

At the time of its construction, Ballymun was a sought-after location and prospective tenants had to pass an interview to get housing there.  There were three types of apartment building: seven "fifteen-storey" towers (which actually had 16 storeys plus plant rooms above), nineteen eight-storey blocks and ten four-storey blocks. The flats were built in the 1960s on contracts from the National Building Agency under the authority of Neil Blaney, the  Minister for Local Government.

Later commentators described the development of the flats and the district as problematic, with the environmental journalist Frank McDonald, in his book The Construction of Dublin, calling it the Irish state's "worst planning disaster", but the issues were not with the apartment buildings as such but the failure to integrate construction of accommodation with provision of services, problematic maintenance, notably of the lifts, the lack of social mix, and the abrupt move of tightly knit inner-city community families to an isolated area on the very edge of the city.  Dublin's City Architect, Ali Grehan, after working as a lead architect and designer with the Ballymun regeneration project, commented that the concept of the area, developed from green fields, and its new (for Ireland) types of accommodation were a "really great idea" but that the project was "doomed to fall into decline" due to poor planning and central government policies. She especially highlighted the scale of the development, its purely public housing nature, and its location — a "constructed around a roundabout ... a dead end". She also noted that the concept envisaged the shopping centre being available from the start, but delayed for years, and the issues with lift and centralised heating system (also a new idea for Ireland) maintenance.

The corporation had more gradual plans for development in multiple locations, and according to geographer Joe Brady of University College Dublin, Dublin Corporation were sceptical about the Ballymun scheme but given the weakness of Irish local government and especially its funding, had little choice but to work with the proposal from national government:

The first tenants moved in between August 1966 and December 1966. By February 1969, when the National Building Agency's contract for Ballymun ceased and control of Ballymun was handed to Dublin Corporation, there was a total of 3,021 dwellings, fully comprising publicly-owned social housing.

Social challenges, community activity
Some social problems occurred in the early years, as families which had grown up in dense city terraces close to Dublin's retail core, found themselves at the edge of the city, with few amenities beyond a small and expensive travelling "van shop".  Over time, Ballymun became notorious for a number of social problems, such as drug abuse and unemployment, and was impacted by negative media coverage of the area.  At the same time, a wide range of local community organisations emerged, for particular areas and towers, and for purposes such as small enterprise support, anti-drugs campaigning and community project support.

The current Ballymun district is not substantially in the townland historically called "Ballymun" — instead, it occupies several nearby townlands, the most significant of which is Stormanstown. Due to what were seen to be undesirable associations, some say that the area has shrunk since the completion of the tower blocks. For instance, in the early days of Dublin City University (DCU), then called NIHE, Dublin, this institution was sometimes referred to as being in Ballymun (part of the "Ballymun Project"), or sometimes in Whitehall, while today it is referred to and has a postal address in Glasnevin, even though it has not changed location.  Indeed, much of the present day central Ballymun lies on lands once in the northern reaches of the Albert Agricultural College estate, the forerunner of the present-day DCU.  Streets have also been renamed — for example, Ballymun Avenue (which was previously Collins Avenue Extension) was renamed Glasnevin Avenue after a local plebiscite in the 1970s.

The city architect commented in 2015 that the "killer blow" for Ballymun was the offering of a tenant-purchase scheme in 1985, which gave good terms for local authority tenants to buy out their accommodation, but only if they had a house, not a flat, which led to many committed community members moving from Ballymun to be able to avail of the offer.  This led to a "cycle of decline" and ultimately the need for a regeneration.

Regeneration of Ballymun

The government and Dublin City Council agreed an ambitious regeneration plan for Ballymun, with a budget exceeding €440 million. The creation of Ballymun Regeneration Limited as a limited company controlled by Dublin City Council initiated the main part of the project, beginning of the demolition of the Ballymun flats, and planned to conclude with the emergence of a "new town" of Ballymun. , six of the seven towers (Pearse, Ceannt, McDermott, McDonagh, Connolly, and Clarke) as well as three eight-storey blocks and seven four-storey blocks had been demolished by DSM, with the residents generally rehoused in new "state-of-the-art" housing in Ballymun. The new housing is a mixture of public, private, voluntary and co-operative housing. The residential aspects of the "new Ballymun" were largely completed by 2013.  Several films and documentary TV programmes were produced during the regeneration period.

Positive aspects
The regeneration delivered the promised new housing, and many other amenities, including reworked park areas, a major City Council office facility, Health Service facilities, a public leisure centre, the Axis arts centre, student accommodation, a new hotel, and some renewed retail facilities.

Criticisms
During the planning and delivery process, the regeneration project attracted well-publicised questions about accountability and democratic participation.  During it, most of the large number of community organisations closed. The regeneration saw the loss of many shops, including the emptying of the only shopping centre, Ballymun Town Centre. This meant the 18,000 residents had to travel to other districts for major grocery, and virtually all non-grocery, shopping. The plan for a replacement centre failed, and as of 2021, there is no central shopping facility.  The shopping centre was eventually demolished in 2020.

Arts during the regeneration
During the regeneration and organisation, Breaking Ground, was set up as a "percent for art" scheme, and commissioned a wide range of projects, including prominent sculptures, and two headline projects, Hotel Ballymun and amaptocare.

In 2007, a floor of the by-then vacant Thomas Clarke Tower was temporarily transformed into a hotel as part of an art project; the project ran for a month and was heavily booked, with a waiting list.

As part of the New Ballymun, a major tree-planting project called amaptocare has been run, with more than 600 people sponsoring the planting of around 635 trees, and providing inscription texts which are engraved on plaques near the trees. Sponsors were informed that the all trees would be identified on a glass panel at Ballymun's central plaza; the plaza was completed by 2013, but the panel has, as of 2019, not yet been made.

The model, Toni Marie Shields, was selected by public auditions, and 3D-imaged in London. Designed to be placed centrally in the district, it was temporarily erected in front of the area's only secondary school, where, as of 2021, it remains.

After regeneration

Local area plan
In 2017, with the formal end of the regeneration, and the dissolution of Ballymun Regeneration Limited, 2,820 apartments had been replaced by just under 2,000 units of social housing, and 1,350 units of privately owned housing, mostly rented out.  The area had moved from 80% of residents living in social housing to just under 60%, with one in eight in private rental, and 28% owner-occupied.  In July 2017, the City Council approved a Local Area Plan for the area, to govern future development.  This plan provided for around 2,000 housing units, of which a significant percentage would be for sale, but with developers to be required to sell 10% to the council or an Approved Housing Body for social housing.  The plan included guidance for 31 distinct sites, totalling 34 hectares, and including as a priority redevelopment of the almost-derelict central shopping centre.

2018 Metro Hotel Dublin
A multistorey hotel fire occurred in the building containing the Metro Hotel Dublin and two floors of apartments, on 21 March 2018. The fire broke out at approximately 8.00 pm and affected the top seven floors of the building. At least 12 units of Dublin Fire Brigade attended the building, and confirmed that the hotel was successfully evacuated. Dublin Fire Brigade reported soon after the fire was extinguished that there were no reports of any casualties or people unaccounted for. This included approximately 150 guests who were staying in the hotel.  The fire broke out in a private residence on the 13th floor, above rooms for hotel guests.

The 15-storey hotel and apartment building was built as part of the Ballymun renewal, developed in 2006 by Pierce Contracting and a group of investors who included businessman Paddy Kelly. The hotel was designed by Shay Cleary Architects for Pierse Contracting and was originally scheduled to open on 9 June 2006, and was operated by the Days Inn Hotel group.

In 2007 a charter plane with 118 passengers and crew narrowly avoided crashing into the hotel after its pilot mistook the red lighting on the hotel's roof combined with its white internal light for the approach lights of a Dublin Airport runway. The incident occurred at 11.34 pm on the night of 16 August 2007, when the McDonnell Douglas jet was carrying 112 passengers and six crew on a charter flight from Lisbon to Dublin.

In April 2014, the 88-bedroom Metro Hotel was put on the market in the region of €2.5 million. Along with the hotel, the sellers sought €3 million for the 30 two-bed apartments on the upper floors of the property. In July 2016, planning permission was refused for the retention of masts and antennae on the hotel.

Transport
Ballymun is served by a number of Dublin Bus routes to the city centre including the numbers 4, 13 and the 155 while the Go-Ahead Ireland route 220 runs between Mulhuddart and DCU Helix and the 220T runs from Finglas Garda station to Whitehall.

The area was also envisaged to have an underground stop on the planned Metro North (Dublin city centre to Swords) line of the Dublin Metro. Plans for that have been revived with the Irish Government's 'Project Ireland 2040' scheme and the revised MetroLink concept. Journey time from Ballymun to the airport is estimated be around ten minutes by car, and to Dublin city centre 25–40 minutes.

Amenities

Education

Retail
In the earliest years of the area's development, it was served by "van shops", often criticised for limited selection and high prices. The area's only shopping centre, Ballymun Town Centre, was built as a central point for the whole community, and was the main source for shopping for over 40 years. It was owned by the City Council, and rented units on commercial terms, with, as of 1991, a rent roll of half a million euro, and service charge income of 300,000 euro. By that time, there were urgent calls from traders and locals for serious refurbishment, but it proved hard to progress these issues due to questions about who should fund any work.

Redevelopment of the centre was a major element of the Ballymun Masterplan from 1997, and was to be private sector-led.  53% of the centre and surrounding site was sold to major developer Treasury Holdings for 6 million pounds in 2000, with the local authority retaining the rest.  As of 2000, the centre was to be redeveloped by 2005, but there were delays, and it was 2009, after financial crisis had struck Ireland, before the developer secured permission for a complex to be called Springcross, involving a planned investment of 800 million euro to provide more than 70 shopping and office units, cinema and other entertainments, dining facilities, a new public library branch, and a creche. Construction was planned for 2010, but by then the site had been taken over by NAMA, and the project was unable to proceed.

Various units had closed during and after the disruption of the regeneration, and the anchor tenant, Tesco Ireland, handed back its unit early in 2014.  In May 2014 NAMA and Treasury's receivers agreed to sell the 53% share back to the council, and in 2016 the Council used compulsory purchase powers to secure clear title to the whole complex, with the final lessees leaving mid-2018, and the centre being boarded up. In 2019 a 1.9 million euro contract to clear the site was awarded, and main demolition started mid-2019.  The Council plans to sell the site to a new developer, who will be permitted to construct a combined retail and residential building. With the closure of the Tesco supermarket, the area is served by two standalone supermarkets, and otherwise by shopping centres in Finglas and Santry.

A small AIB branch, which used to be a Bank of Ireland branch before closure in 1984, was demolished in 2017 and replaced by a new AIB branch near the Civic Centre. The Republic of Ireland's only IKEA store is located nearby on St. Margaret's Road.

Civic centre

On the site of a former large underpass and roundabout, a brand new civic complex was built, including The Axis arts centre (opened in 2001), with the local health centre (completed and opened in 2003) and Garda station also moved here, although their defunct buildings remained across the road. City Council offices are also here, although the offices handling some services, such as driver licensing and motor taxation, closed as part of broader changes in such service delivery.

Other amenities
A number of green spaces, parks and playgrounds have been built around the district, and some were remodelled during the regeneration, notably Poppintree Park.

Two hotels, Travelodge and Metro are located in this area, as well as a city-owned gym and leisure centre (the old Ballymun swimming pool was demolished in 2016 after being defunct for a number of years).

Religion
There is a church in the old village centre, which was built in 1847 and replaced a penal chapel. Ballymun is a parish in the Fingal South West deanery of the Roman Catholic Archdiocese of Dublin.

Sport
There are a number of local sports groups, including:
 In soccer: Belclare Celtic, St Pats Phoenix Football Club and Ballymun United Football Club.
 For the GAA, Ballymun Kickhams Gaelic Football Club and Setanta Hurling Club

Governance and politics
Ballymun is in the jurisdiction of Dublin City Council, and for local elections it is part of the Finglas-Ballymun local electoral area.  It is in the council's Dublin North West area, and hosts one of two area offices for that division of the city, the other being in Finglas.

Ballymun in the media
For decades, Ballymun's reputation was damaged by a high level of negative publicity in the media, usually focusing on crime and drugs, whilst ignoring positive news.

Television and film

About Ballymun
The 1992 film Into the West was set, and filmed, in Ballymun.

Other fictional works that were set in the area were the 1994 drama mini-series Family and the 1982 short film One Day Time .

Documentary
Several documentaries of the area have been made throughout the years, notably during the regeneration.  A film of the leisure centre by filmmakers Joe Lawlor and Christine Molloy, LEISURE CENTRE, was made in 2007 and starred hundreds of Ballymun residents.  A documentary film entitled Ballymun Lullaby was released in February 2011 and includes scenes detailing the regeneration of Ballymun as well as its impact on the culture of its populace.  In 2018 The 4th Act looked back at the whole regeneration, with contextual material about the area's history; it had significant appearances from several community activists, and City Council and BRL officials, and the artists, Seamus Nolan and Jochen Gerz, who led the biggest Ballymun arts projects, Hotel Ballymun and amaptocare respectively. It also highlighted the compilation and even printing of the area's oral history project, which sponsor Ballymun Regeneration then refused to publish and distribute.

Using Ballymun as urban setting
Bloody Sunday, a 2002 British-Irish film written and directed by Paul Greengrass and based around the 1972 "Bloody Sunday" incident in Northern Ireland. The film was mostly shot in Ballymun, with some location scenes shot in Northern Ireland.

Books
In September 2006, Gill & Macmillan published The Mun, by Lynn Connolly. This is a memoir covering the history of Ballymun from its inception to the final regeneration of the town. The Mun was Connolly's account of another side of Ballymun, of which she had fond memories, not press stories about drug dealing and gangsters but accounts of a community that thrived in spite of the squalor.

In April 2009, Irish publisher Gill & Macmillan published Ballymun resident Rachael Keogh's account of her life as a heroin addict, Dying to Survive. Rachael started taking drugs aged 12 and for the next 15 years was hooked on a variety of substances. In 2006, after repeated attempts to get help, Rachael went to the media to publicise her plight.

In 2010 New Island Books published The Ballymun Trilogy by the Dublin playwright, Dermot Bolger: three plays that chart forty years of life in Ballymun and which were all premiered in Axis in Ballymun before being staged in Britain, America, Poland and elsewhere.

Notable residents

 Patrick Clarke, filmmaker, Sillogue Road from 1967 to 1972
 Aoife Dooley, writer, illustrator, comedienne lives there
 Glen Hansard, musician
 M. J. Hyland, author, lived there for two years and uses the experience in "Carry Me Down"
 James McCarthy, Gaelic footballer
 Philly McMahon, Gaelic footballer
 Barney Rock, Gaelic footballer
 Dean Rock, Gaelic footballer

See also
 List of towns and villages in Ireland

References

External links 

 Ballymun Regeneration Ltd, with much about all aspects of the regeneration
 Photos of the demolition of one of the flats

 
Towns and villages in Dublin (city)
Populated places established in 1966